Peopleware: Productive Projects and Teams is a 1987 book on the social side of software development, specifically managing project teams.  It was written by software consultants Tom DeMarco and Tim Lister, from their experience in the world of software development.  This book was revised in 2013.

Overview
Peopleware is a popular book about software organization management. The first chapter of the book claims, "The major problems of our work are not so much technological as sociological in nature". The book approaches sociological or 'political' problems such as group chemistry and team jelling,  "flow time" and quiet in the work environment, and the high cost of turnover.   Other topics include the conflicts between individual work perspective and corporate ideology, corporate entropy, "teamicide" and workspace theory.

The authors presented most subjects as principles backed up by some concrete story or other information. As an example, the chapter "Spaghetti Dinner" presents a fictional example of a manager inviting a new team over for dinner, then having them buy and prepare the meal as a group, in order to produce a first team success. Other chapters use real-life stories or cite various studies to illustrate the principles being presented.

Editions
1st Edition: 1987
2nd Edition: 1999
The second edition kept the original content with only a few changes or corrections. The bulk of the new content was in a new section at the end. The new section's chapters revisited some of the concepts of the original chapters with changes and added new ones.
The eBook PDF version published by DorsetHouse was not searchable as each page appeared to be an image.  The Kindle version is searchable.
3rd Edition: 2013
The new content of the third edition is spread out through the book. There are new chapters, but the original content has also been updated.

See also
 Peopleware as a more general concept.
 The Mythical Man-Month

References

Information technology consulting
1987 non-fiction books
Software development books
Software project management